Harold O'Neill may refer to:

Harold O'Neill (1928–1983), member of the South Australian House of Assembly
Harold O'Neill (footballer), see 1935–36 French Division 1
Harold O'Neill (footballer, born 1894)

See also
Harold O'Neil, professor
Harry O'Neill (disambiguation)
Harold O'Neal, musician